Poleto is a village in Simitli Municipality, in Blagoevgrad Province, in southwestern Bulgaria.

References

Villages in Blagoevgrad Province